Sijtje van der Lende (born 31 January 1950) is a former speed skater from the Netherlands and a skating coach. She competed at the 1976 and  1980 Winter Olympics in all distances from 500 to 3000 m. Her best achievement was ninth place in the 3000 m in 1976.

She won the national allround title in 1976 and 1977 and finished in third place in 1974, 1975, 1978 and 1980.

Personal bests: 
500 m – 43.66 (1980)
 1000 m – 1:25.86 (1980)
 1500 m – 2:12.59 (1979)
 3000 m – 4:39.15 (1977)
 5000 m – 8:25.3 (1982)

After retirement she worked as a skating coach with various teams in the Netherlands, and in 1994 became the first female national coach. Her last professional speedskatingteam was VPZ (2005-2008). From 2008 till the Olympic winter games at Vancouver in 2010 she works with the national team of China.  At the moment she's advisor for Topteam North Netherlands, a group of talented young speed skaters in this district.

References

External links
 

1950 births
Living people
Dutch female speed skaters
Olympic speed skaters of the Netherlands
Speed skaters at the 1976 Winter Olympics
Speed skaters at the 1980 Winter Olympics
Sportspeople from Friesland
People from Weststellingwerf
Dutch speed skating coaches
Dutch sports coaches
21st-century Dutch women
20th-century Dutch women